John Alexander McDougall (c.1810–1894) was an American painter and photographer, known for his portrait miniatures. Born in Livingston, New Jersey, he studied at the National Academy of Design in New York City, and lived for much of his life in Newark, New Jersey. McDougall was good friends with painters George Inness and Asher B. Durand, as well as writers Washington Irving and Edgar Allan Poe, whom he painted. His miniatures, some of which were unusually small, are found in the permanent collections of the Metropolitan Museum of Art and the Smithsonian American Art Museum. He died in Newark on July 29, 1894. He had a daughter and five sons, including the cartoonist Walt McDougall, the artist John A. McDougall Jr. (also a miniaturist), and Harry C. McDougall, proprietor of the Newark Sunday Call.

Notes

References

Year of birth uncertain
1894 deaths
Artists from Newark, New Jersey
People from Livingston, New Jersey
American portrait painters
Portrait miniaturists
19th-century American painters
19th-century American male artists
American male painters
Painters from New Jersey
National Academy of Design alumni